No Easy Way Out is the debut studio album from American singer-songwriter Robert Tepper, released by Scotti Brothers Records in 1986. It reached No. 144 on the US Billboard 200 chart.

Four singles were released from the album: "No Easy Way Out", "Don't Walk Away", "Angel of the City" and "If That's What You Call Lovin'". "No Easy Way Out" reached No. 22 on the Billboard Hot 100. "Don't Walk Away" reached No. 85 on the same chart.

Having signed with Scotti Brothers Records in 1985, Tepper's debut album was preceded by the title track, which Sylvester Stallone had heard and chose to feature on the soundtrack of his film Rocky IV. "Angel of the City" was also featured on the soundtrack of Stallone's 1986 film Cobra.

In a 1997 interview with Stefan Edström for aor.nu, Tepper said of the album: "As a piece of work it really was part of the times, and the style was kind of progressive, people really hooked into it. As a work for eighties rock 'n' roll it was really strong, there was a lot of great songs on it."

Critical reception

Upon release, Billboard wrote: "Title track and first single have been an auspicious debut for Tepper. Album holds the promise of several more singles, most notably "Don't Walk Away" and "Restless World," with similarly punchy production and powerhouse vocals. Has to be considered a serious contender."

Track listing

Chart performance

References

1986 debut albums
Scotti Brothers Records albums
Albums produced by Joe Chiccarelli
Robert Tepper albums